Rana Saddam Hussein (born July 25, 1969) is the second-eldest daughter of the former President of Iraq, Saddam Hussein and his first wife, Sajida Talfah.  Her older sister is Raghad and younger sister is Hala Hussein.

Biography

In 1986, she married Saddam Kamel al-Majid, brother of Hussein Kamel al-Majid, her elder sister Raghad's husband, she has four children. She accompanied her husband to Jordan in 1995, where she lived from August 8 of that year to February 20, 1996. They returned to Iraq after receiving assurances from Saddam Hussein that he would pardon Kamel and his brother, Hussein Kamel al-Majid. Despite this promise, before the end of the month, both Kamels were shot and killed by other clan members who declared them traitors.

In 1997, her brother Uday Hussein put Rana and her sister Raghad under house arrest for being involved in a plot to assassinate him.

On July 31, 2003, she went back to Jordan, where King Abdullah granted her family asylum.

References 

1969 births
Daughters of national leaders
Living people
Iraqi people of Arab descent
Iraqi Sunni Muslims
Tulfah family
Place of birth missing (living people)